Foxhoven is a surname. Notable people with the surname include:

Brad Foxhoven, American film producer and entertainment executive
Danielle Foxhoven (born 1989), American soccer player and coach